The Santa Monica Mountains is a coastal mountain range in Southern California, next to the Pacific Ocean. It is part of the Transverse Ranges. Because of its proximity to densely populated regions, it is one of the most visited natural areas in California. The Santa Monica Mountains National Recreation Area encompasses this mountain range.

Geography
The western mountains, separating the Conejo Valley from Malibu, suddenly end at Mugu Peak as the rugged, nearly impassible shoreline gives way to tidal lagoons and coastal sand dunes of the alluvial Oxnard Plain. The mountain range contributed to the isolation of this vast coastal plain before regular transportation routes reached western Ventura County. The eastern mountains form a barrier between the San Fernando Valley and the Los Angeles Basin, separating "the Valley" on the north and west-central Los Angeles on the south. The Santa Monica Mountains are parallel to the Santa Susana Mountains, which are located directly north of the mountains across the San Fernando Valley.

The range is of moderate height, with no particularly craggy or prominent peaks outside the Sandstone Peak and Boney Mountains area. While often rugged and wild, the range hosts a substantial amount of human activity and development. Houses, roads, businesses, and recreational centers are dotted throughout the Santa Monica Mountains.

A number of creeks in the Santa Monica Mountains are part of the Los Angeles River watershed. Beginning at the western end of the San Fernando Valley, the river runs to the north of the mountains. After passing between the range and the Verdugo Mountains it flows south around Elysian Park, defining the easternmost extent of the mountains.

Archeology
The Santa Monica Mountains have more than 1,000 archeology sites of significance, primarily from the Californian Native American cultures of the Tongva and Chumash people. The mountains were part of their regional homelands for over eight thousand years before the arrival of the Spanish. The Spanish mission system had a dramatic impact on their culture, and by 1831 their population had dropped from over 22,000 to under 3,000.

Geology
Geologists consider the northern Channel Islands to be a westward extension of the Santa Monicas into the Pacific Ocean. The range was created by repeated episodes of uplifting and submergence by the Raymond Fault, which created complex layers of sedimentary rock, some containing fossils of invertebrates and fish. Malibu Creek, which eroded its own channel while the mountains were slowly uplifted, bisects the mountain range.

Climate 

The Santa Monica Mountains have dry summers with frequent coastal fog on the ocean (south) side of the range and rainy, cooler winters. In the summer, the climate is quite dry (except for the coastal fog), which makes the range prone to wildfires, especially during dry "Santa Ana" wind events. 

Snow is unusual in the Santa Monica Mountains, since they are not as high as the nearby San Gabriel Mountains. The bulk of the rain falls between November and March. The higher rainfall in the central and western parts of the range results in more widespread woodlands (with oak, sycamore, walnut, bay laurel, alder and other trees) than the eastern part of the range, where trees are usually restricted to the stream courses.

On January 17, 2007, an unusually cold storm brought snow in the Santa Monica Mountains. The hills above Malibu picked up three inches (eight centimeters) of snow - the first measurable snow in fifty years. Snow was reported on Boney Peak in the winter of 2005; and in March 2006, snow also fell on the summit of the mountain. Snow also fell on the peak of Boney Peak in late December 2008. The latest recorded snowfall in the area was in February 2019, when an unusual amount of snowfall accumulated in low passes in the mountains. That storm system also brought rare snowfall to the Los Angeles area. Heavy graupel was recorded in Malibu Canyon on January 23, 2021. It accumulated as low as 400 feet in elevation.

Wildfire 
In the Santa Monica Mountains, when the fuels, seasonal drought, wind, and terrain combine with an ignition, a major wildfire occurs. These fires are large, wind-driven canopy fires that consume the above ground vegetation and often cause major property damage and home losses.

In 2018, the Woolsey Fire burned through 88% of the federal parkland resulting in trails being closed for months.  The fire, which was three times larger than the biggest fire ever before in the mountains, burned over 40% of the natural area in the Santa Monicas.  A restoration plan was developed to plant 100,000 trees, shrubs and grasses of 25 different species.

Protected areas

Much of the mountains are located within the Santa Monica Mountains National Recreation Area. Preservation of lands within the region are managed by the Santa Monica Mountains Conservancy, the National Park Service, the California State Parks, and County and Municipal agencies. The Santa Monica Mountains face pressure from local populations as a desirable residential area, and in the parks as a recreational retreat and wild place that's increasingly rare in urban Los Angeles. In 2014 the California Coastal Commission and the Los Angeles County Board of Supervisors approved the Santa Monica Mountains Local Coastal Program, a land-use plan that will distinguish between the private lands that need strict protection and property that could be developed in strict conformance with this detailed plan.

Regional parks
Over twenty individual state and municipal parks are in the Santa Monica Mountains, including: Topanga State Park, Leo Carrillo State Park, Malibu Creek State Park, Point Mugu State Park, Will Rogers State Historic Park, Point Dume State Beach, Griffith Park, Marvin Braude Mulholland Gateway Park, Charmlee Wilderness Park, Franklin Canyon Park, Runyon Canyon Park, King Gillette Ranch Park, and Paramount Ranch Park.

Satwiwa
The Satwiwa Native American Indian Culture Center in Newbury Park, California is located within the Santa Monica Mountains National Recreation Area. The area was purchased by the U.S. National Park Service in 1980. The Rosewood Trail near Stagecoach Inn, which leads to Angel Vista is an access point in Newbury Park.

Griffith Park

At the eastern end of the Santa Monica Mountains are Griffith Park and Elysian Park. Griffith Park is separated from the rest of the Santa Monica Mountains to the west by the Cahuenga Pass, over which the 101 Freeway (also called the Hollywood Freeway) passes from the San Fernando Valley into Hollywood. Elysian Park is in the easternmost part of the mountains and is bordered by the Los Angeles River to the east and Downtown Los Angeles nearby to the south.

Rim of the Valley Trail
The Rim of the Valley Trail is a plan in progress for accessing and connecting the parkland and recreational areas of the mountains surrounding the Conejo, San Fernando, Simi, and Crescenta Valleys. With trailheads in the mountains and valleys, it would link them through existing and new: walking, hiking, equestrian, and mountain biking trails; parklands; and conservation easements. The Rim of the Valley project also has the goal to protect flora and fauna habitats and wildlife corridors between the Santa Monica Mountains and the inland ranges.

Flora and fauna

Fauna

The range is host to a variety of wildlife. A common cause of bobcat fatalities is being struck by vehicles. Their main cause of death is mange, a skin disease often found in animals that have ingested rat poison.

The mountain lions population is challenged because the Santa Monica Mountains are isolated and not big enough for weaned cubs to find their own territory. The primary cause of the decline is due to a combination of traffic-related mortality, anti-coagulants ingested from human poisoned prey, and attacks by other, more dominant mountain lions. The Wallis Annenberg Wildlife Crossing will bridge the Ventura Freeway which acts as a barrier in the wildlife corridor between the Simi Hills to the north and the Santa Monica Mountains to the south. The National Park Service has recorded a dozen mountain lions struck and killed by motorists on this section of freeway since 2002 when they began a study. Mountain lions approach this particular area and turn back without attempting the hazardous crossing of the freeway as shown by GPS tracking collars fitted to them by the researchers.  In 2020, wildlife biologists found the first evidence of physical abnormalities in the isolated population. Newcomers would bring new genetic material into the mountains where the lack of genetic diversity is a serious threat to their long-term survival. It would  allow young mountain lions, born in the Santa Monicas, a chance to find a new territory before possibly being killed by one of the more dominant, older males. P-22 was a wild mountain lion residing in Griffith Park in the eastern end of the range.

Snakes are common but only occasionally seen: the Southern Pacific rattlesnake (the only venomous species), mountain kingsnake, California kingsnake, gopher snake, and garter snake. The mountains are also home to the western fence lizard and the coastal whiptail. Also the endangered Southern California Distinct Population Segment of steelhead is found here.

The population of red-legged frogs is small and isolated, and was impacted by the Woolsey Fire swept through the area in November 2018.

Flora

The Santa Monica Mountains are in the California chaparral and woodlands ecoregion, and includes the California oak woodland and southern coastal sage scrub plant community, and are covered by hundreds of local plant species, some of which are very rare or endemic, and others which are widespread and have become popular horticultural ornamentals. Dudleya verityi is a rare species of succulent plant known by the common name Verity's liveforever. Endemic to Ventura County, this species is only found on one edge of the Santa Monica Mountains, where it occurs in coastal sage scrub habitat. The most common trees in the mountains are oak and sycamore. The California black walnut, endemic to California, grows on the northern side of the mountains in the Valley and Griffith Park. Other species include willow and alder (along stream courses) and bay laurel. Several species of ferns (including large sword ferns) are found in wetter, shady areas throughout the range, especially near streams.

Invasive species
Many invasive weeds have colonized the mountain habitats which can bring about significant changes in the ecosystems by altering the native plant communities and the processes that support them. These non-native plants include annual Mediterranean grasses, Spanish broom (Genista juncea), and yellow starthistle (Centaurea solstitialis).  In creekside riparian habitats are found plants such as giant cane (Arundo donax), German ivy (Delairea odorata), blue periwinkle (Vinca major), and ivy (Hedera spp.).

More frequent fires have created conditions favorable to invasive plants. The 2018 Woolsey Fire burned through 88% of the federal parkland.  The fire, which was three times larger than the biggest fire ever before in the mountains, burned over 40% of the natural area in the Santa Monicas. The fire created a challenge to native plants as black mustard with bright yellow flowers quickly established itself as a wet winter followed the fire. The mustard plants will also provide fuel for the next fires.

The New Zealand mud snail is an invasive species found in the Santa Monica Mountains, that pose a serious threat to native species, complicating efforts to improve stream-water quality for the endangered steelhead. Within a period of four years, the snails expanded from their first known population in Medea Creek in Agoura Hills to nearly 30 other stream sites. Researchers at the Santa Monica Bay Restoration Commission believe the snails' expansion may have been expedited after the mollusks traveled from stream to stream on the gear of contractors and volunteers.

Roads and access

Cahuenga Pass, present-day site of U.S. Route 101, is the easiest pass through the range connecting the Los Angeles Basin to the San Fernando Valley. In the 1800s, two battles were fought there, and the Treaty of Cahuenga was signed nearby. In Hollywood's heyday, movie studios were found clustered on both sides of the highway.

Sepulveda Pass is the main north–south pass to the west, connecting the Westside to Sherman Oaks via the San Diego Freeway (I-405) and Sepulveda Boulevard.

Minor passes between the Sepulveda and Cahuenga passes include: Laurel Canyon Boulevard, Coldwater Canyon Avenue, and Beverly Glen Boulevard. Further west of the Sepulveda Pass are Topanga Canyon Boulevard (SR 27), Malibu Canyon Road and Kanan Dume Road.

Mulholland Drive runs much of the length of the Santa Monica Mountains, from Cahuenga Pass to Woodland Hills, although it is not open to motor vehicles west of Encino. The Mulholland Highway runs from Woodland Hills to Sequit Point at the Pacific Ocean.

Area communities

The eastern end of the range, located in the City of Los Angeles, is more intensively developed than the western end. The city of Malibu runs between the coast and the leading mountain ridge, from Topanga Canyon in the east to Leo Carrillo State Park in the west.

Communities along the north slope of the mountains include (from east to west):
 the Los Angeles communities of:
 the unincorporated area of Universal City
 Studio City
 Sherman Oaks
 Encino
 Tarzana
 Woodland Hills
 West Hills
 Calabasas
 Bell Canyon
 Agoura Hills
 Westlake Village
 Thousand Oaks
 Newbury Park

Communities along the south slope of the mountains include (from east to west):
 the Los Angeles communities of:
 Los Feliz
 Hollywood Hills
 Bel-Air
 Benedict Canyon
 Brentwood
 Pacific Palisades
 Beverly Hills
 Santa Monica
 the unincorporated community of Topanga
 Malibu
 Solromar

Named peaks

Adjacent ranges
 Chalk Hills (in Woodland Hills)
 San Gabriel Mountains
 Santa Susana Mountains
 Simi Hills
 Verdugo Mountains

See also 

 1978 Agoura-Malibu firestorm
 Canyon Fire, in October 2007
 Chumash people
 Mulholland Highway
 Santa Monica Mountains National Recreation Area
 Parks in the Santa Monica Mountains
 Index: Natural history of the Santa Monica Mountains

References

External links

  (Santa Monica Mountains National Recreation Area)
 Wildflowers of the Santa Monica Mountains
 Outdoor LA Hiking Trails Trails and trailheads with maps and directions.
 Ventura County Trails in SMMNRA Maps and trails descriptions.
 Santa Monica Mountains Conservancy
 Santa Monica Mountains Mountain Bike Trailmap
 Santa Monica Mountains Institute
 Santa Monica Mountains Local Coastal Program Los Angeles County Department of Regional Planning

 
Mountain ranges of Southern California
Transverse Ranges
Mountain ranges of Los Angeles County, California
Mountain ranges of Ventura County, California
Geography of the San Fernando Valley
Malibu, California
Archaeological sites in California